Jānis Bojārs (12 May 1956 – 5 June 2018) was a Latvian male shot putter, best known for winning the silver medal for the Soviet Union in the men's shot put event at the 1982 European Championships in Athens, Greece. He set his personal best (21.74 m) on 14 July 1984 at a meet in Riga.

External links
1982 Year Ranking

1956 births
2018 deaths
Latvian male shot putters
Soviet male shot putters
Place of birth missing
European Athletics Championships medalists
World Athletics Indoor Championships medalists